In total, 214 cricket grounds have hosted at least one women's Twenty20 International (WT20I) cricket match, including multiple grounds in a single venue (such as Independence Park in Port Vila) Twenty20 Internationals are the most recent form of international women's cricket to be introduced, and also the shortest, played using the reduce Twenty20 format. The first match was played at the County Ground, Hove in 2004 and over 1,350 women's T20Is have been played since.

Sixty-two countries have hosted at least one women's T20I match. England and India have provided the most venues, with 23 and 17, respectively. There have also been numerous venues used in countries outside of the traditional cricket playing nations since the ICC announced that all Twenty20 matches between women's international teams of member nations would be eligible for have the WT20I status. The venue that has hosted the most Women's Twenty20 Internationals is the Gahanga International Cricket Stadium which has hosted 50 games (although the Botswana Cricket Association Oval has hosted a total of 52 games in total at its two grounds).

List of grounds
As of 18 March 2023 (WT20I 1388):

Grounds by country

See also
 List of Test cricket grounds
 List of women's Test cricket grounds
 List of One Day International cricket grounds
 List of women's One Day International cricket grounds
 List of Twenty20 International cricket grounds

References

External links 
Cricinfo – Grounds

Twenty20, women
Grounds